Novye Atagi (: , Ƶima Ataġa) is a rural locality (a selo) in Shalinsky District of the Chechen Republic, Russia, located  south of Grozny. Population:  

Novye Atagi is separated from Starye Atagi by the Argun River.

See also
ICRC Hospital of Novye Atagi

References

External links
The attack on the ICRC hospital in Novye Atagi
17 December 1996 : Six ICRC delegates assassinated in Chechnya

Rural localities in Shalinsky District